The 2011–12 Ligue 1 season was the 74th since its establishment. Lille were the defending champions. The league schedule was announced on 31 March 2011 and the fixtures were determined on 10 June. The season began on 6 August 2011 and ended on 20 May 2012. The winter break was in effect from 22 December 2011 to 14 January 2012.

On 20 May 2012, the final day of the league season, Montpellier clinched its first-ever league title after defeating Auxerre 2–1 at the Stade de l'Abbé-Deschamps.  Montpellier was the fifth different club to win Ligue 1 since the 2006–07 season and qualified for the UEFA Champions League for the first time in its history. Paris Saint-Germain and Lille were the country's other Champions League participants, while Lyon, Bordeaux, and Marseille represented France in the UEFA Europa League. Lyon did not participate in UEFA's top football club competition for the first time in 12 years.

Auxerre, Dijon, and Caen were relegated to Ligue 2. Auxerre returned to the second division after 32 consecutive years playing in Ligue 1. Prior to the 2011–12 season, the club had never suffered relegation from the country's top division. Dijon returned to the second division after only one season in Ligue 1, while Caen fell to the second tier after two years in the first division.

Teams 

There were three promoted teams from Ligue 2, replacing the three teams that were relegated from Ligue 1 following the 2010–11 season. A total of 20 teams competed in the league with three clubs suffering relegation to the second division, Ligue 2. All clubs that secured Ligue 1 status for the season were subject to approval by the DNCG before becoming eligible to participate.

Arles-Avignon was the first club to suffer relegation from the first division to Ligue 2. The club's impending drop occurred on 17 April 2011 following the team's 2–0 defeat to AS Monaco. The negative result made it mathematically impossible for Arles to seize the 17th position in the table, which would have allowed the club to remain in Ligue 1. Arles-Avignon made its return to Ligue 2 after only a year's spell in the top division of French football. On 15 May, Lens were relegated from the first division to Ligue 2 after its 1–1 draw with Monaco. Lens returned to Ligue 2 for the first time since the 2008–09 season when the club finished as champions of the league. On the final day of the Ligue 1 season, Monaco suffered relegation to the second division after losing 2–0 to Lyon. The club's appearance in Ligue 2 was its first since 1976.

Evian became the first club from Ligue 2 to achieve promotion to Ligue 1 after its 2–1 victory over Reims on 20 May 2011. Evian made its debut in the first division and, similar to Arles-Avignon the previous season, the club's ascension to the first division is notable due in part to the fact that it has achieved successive promotions in four straight seasons. On the final day of the Ligue 2 season, both Dijon and Ajaccio earned berths in the first division after posting positive results in their respective matches. Dijon was promoted despite losing on the match day and, similar to Évian, made its debut in the top division of French football. Ajaccio returned to Ligue 1 after five seasons in the second division.

Stadia and locations

Personnel and kits 

Note: Flags indicate national team as has been defined under FIFA eligibility rules. Players and managers may hold more than one non-FIFA nationality.

1 Subject to change during the season.

Managerial changes

Ownership changes

League table

Results

Statistics

Top goalscorers

Last updated: 20 May 2012
Source: Official Goalscorers' Standings

Hat-tricks

Scoring 

First goal of the season: Anthony Mounier for Nice against Lyon (6 August 2011)
Fastest goal of the season: 18 seconds – Jaroslav Plašil for Bordeaux against Nancy (4 December 2011)
Latest goal of the season: 90+4 minutes – François Clerc for Nice against Lille (21 December 2011)
First own goal of the season: Abdoulaye Bamba (Dijon) for Lyon (10 September 2011)
Widest winning margin: 5 goals
Paris Saint-Germain 6–1 Sochaux (22 April 2012)
Highest scoring game: 9 goals
Lille 4–5 Bordeaux
Most goals scored in a match by a single team: 6 goals 
Sochaux 2–6 Rennes (21 September 2011)
Paris Saint-Germain 6–1 Sochaux (22 April 2012)

Discipline 

Worst overall disciplinary record (1 pt per yellow card, 3 pts per red card): 119 points
Ajaccio (92 yellow & 9 red cards)
Best overall disciplinary record: 66 points
 Sochaux (60 yellow & 2 red cards)
Most yellow cards (club): 92
Ajaccio
Most yellow cards (player): 13
Mehdi Mostefa (Ajaccio)
Most red cards (club): 9
Ajaccio
Most red cards (player): 3
Jean-Pascal Mignot (Saint-Étienne)

Awards

Monthly awards

Annual awards

UNFP Ligue 1 Player of the Year 

The  UNFP Ligue 1 Player of the Year was awarded to Eden Hazard.

UNFP Young Player of the Year 

The  UNFP Young Player of the Year was awarded to Younès Belhanda.

UNFP Ligue 1 Goalkeeper of the Year 

The UNFP Goalkeeper of the Year was awarded to Hugo Lloris.

UNFP Team of the Year 

Goalkeeper: Hugo Lloris (Lyon)
Defence: Mathieu Debuchy (Lille), Hilton (Montpellier), Nicolas Nkoulou (Marseille), Henri Bedimo (Montpellier)
Midfield: Rio Mavuba (Lille), Étienne Capoue (Toulouse), Younès Belhanda (Montpellier), Eden Hazard (Lille)
Attack: Olivier Giroud (Montpellier), Nenê (Paris Saint-Germain)

UNFP Ligue 1 Manager of the Year 

The UNFP Manager of the Year was awarded to René Girard of Montpellier.

Number of teams by region

List of 2011–12 transfers

References

External links 

 Official site

 

2011-12
1
Fra